"Call It What You Want" is a 1991 song by New Kids on the Block.  Written and produced by Maurice Starr, the original version appears on the group's third album Step By Step.  A club/house remix produced by Robert Clivillés & David Cole, which also featured a rap intro by Freedom Williams, later appeared on the group's 1990 hits compilation, No More Games/The Remix Album and would ultimately serve as the second single to be released from that album.  The lead vocals were sung by Jordan Knight, Joey McIntyre, and Donnie Wahlberg.

Release and reception
Upon its release, the song was another single that received decent (though not enthusiastic) airplay in North America during the spring months of 1991 and could be considered the "last hurrah" in terms of singles from the group's initial run. The single peaked at #12 on the UK Singles Chart. While the group played this song in concert during their 1994 Face the Music Tour, it was not played again until the New Kids on the Block: Live tour on March 7, 2009.

Version 
"Call It What You Want (C&C Pump-It Mix) - 6:31
"Call It What You Want (C&C Pump-It Mix) [Radio Edit] - 4:12
"Call It What You Want (Original Version) - 4:11

Charts

References

External links
official video

1991 singles
New Kids on the Block songs
Columbia Records singles
Songs written by Maurice Starr
1990 songs
Song recordings produced by Maurice Starr
Music videos directed by Tamra Davis